Shipra Khanna is an Indian celebrity chef, restaurateur, author and television personality. She is best known for, at the age of 29, winning the second season of the Indian television show MasterChef India (2012) which aired on Star Plus.

Personal life 
Born and brought up in Shimla, she went to school at Loreto convent and completed her graduation in Economics and Psychology from St Bede's.
Shipra was married at the age of 19 and has 2 children from this marriage - one girl and one boy child. Shipra, having endured 10 years of being mistreated in her marriage, walked out of the abusive relationship in January 2011 and subsequently filed for Divorce and custody of her 2 Children. Following which her mother enrolled her for the MasterChef India TV show.

Career
After winning MasterChef India (season 2), Shipra had a television show as a celebrity chef on Food Food, and went on to star in many more Televised Cooking Shows.

On 11 September 2013, she opened her first Restaurant in Ahmedabad, Gujarat named "H.O.T - House of Taste"

On 14 January 2017, Shipra Opened her First Restaurant in New Delhi, India named The Darzi Bar & Kitchen.

Awards and honours
 She was honoured with the title of ‘The Culinary Ambassador to Spain’ by the Spanish Ambassador to India in 2017.
 In 2014, She was honoured with the title of 'Culinary Connoisseur' for Tourism Australia and Cox & Kings
 She has been honoured by Le Cordon Bleu, Paris.
 She won the title "Women Chef taking taste beyond borders" by SAARC Chamber Women Entrepreneurs Council (SCWEC).
 She won the "Best Television Chef Book Outside Europe" by Gourmand World Cookbook Awards 2017.

Bibliography

 The Spice Route (2013)
 The Spice Route 1
 Sinfully Yours
 Super Foods for Awesome Memory 
 Super Foods to Keep Your Brain Strong and Mood Lighter
 Empty Jaws Narrating Stories: Heart Touching Short Stories
 Simply Maharashrian
 Simply Punjabi
 Simply Rajasthani
 Simply Gujarati 
 SIMPLY HIMACHALI

References

External links
 
 

Reality cooking competition winners
Indian chefs
Living people
People from Shimla
Indian television chefs
Women chefs
Indian women television presenters
Indian television presenters
Artists from Himachal Pradesh
Year of birth missing (living people)